Svart Lucia (lit. "Black Lucia" or "Black Saint Lucy's Day") is a Swedish-Danish film which was released to cinemas in Sweden on 11 December 1992, directed by Rumle Hammerich. At the 28th Guldbagge Awards Tova Magnusson Norling was nominated for the Best Actress award.

Plot
Secondary school student Mikaela writes an erotic novel and gives it to her teacher.

Cast
Tova Magnusson-Norling as Mikaela Holm
Figge Norling as Joakim
Björn Kjellman as Max
Liv Alsterlund as Sandra
Malin Berghagen as Justine
Niklas Hjulström as Johan
Lars Green as Göran
Agneta Ekmanner as Gunvor Holm
Marie Göranzon as Birgitta
Reine Brynolfsson as Spielman (the teacher)
and Thomas Roos, Catherine Hansson, Gunnel Fred, Josefin Ankarberg, Annmari Kastrup, Anna Godenius, Mattias Knave, Joakim Jennefors, W. Moses J. Bone, Frida Hallgren, Berit Palm, Caroline af Ugglas, Rumle Hammerich.

References

External links

1992 films
1990s thriller films
1990s Swedish-language films
Swedish Christmas films
Danish Christmas films
1990s Christmas films
1990s Swedish films